Hambright is a surname. Notable people with the surname include:

Charles M. Hambright (1845–1938), American businessman and politician
Frederick Hambright (1727–1817), American military officer
Pat Hambright (born 1967), American journalist
Roger Hambright (born 1949), American baseball player